Proxima Centauri is a small, low-mass star located  away from the Sun in the southern constellation of Centaurus. Its Latin name means the 'nearest [star] of Centaurus'. It was discovered in 1915 by Robert Innes and is the nearest-known star to the Sun. With a quiescent apparent magnitude of 11.13, it is too faint to be seen with the unaided eye. Proxima Centauri is a member of the Alpha Centauri star system, being identified as component Alpha Centauri C, and is 2.18° to the southwest of the Alpha Centauri AB pair. It is currently  from AB, which it orbits with a period of about 550,000 years.

Proxima Centauri is a red dwarf star with a mass about 12.5% of the Sun's mass, and average density about 33 times that of the Sun. Because of Proxima Centauri's proximity to Earth, its angular diameter can be measured directly. Its actual diameter is about one-seventh (14%) the diameter of the Sun. Although it has a very low average luminosity, Proxima Centauri is a flare star that randomly undergoes dramatic increases in brightness because of magnetic activity. The star's magnetic field is created by convection throughout the stellar body, and the resulting flare activity generates a total X-ray emission similar to that produced by the Sun. The internal mixing of its fuel by convection through its core, and Proxima's relatively low energy-production rate, mean that it will be a main-sequence star for another four trillion years.

Proxima Centauri has two known exoplanets and one candidate exoplanet: Proxima Centauri b, Proxima Centauri d and the disputed Proxima Centauri c. Its estimated mass is at least 1.07 times that of Earth. Proxima b orbits within Proxima Centauri's habitable zone—the range where temperatures are right for liquid water to exist on its surface—but, because Proxima Centauri is a red dwarf and a flare star, the planet's habitability is highly uncertain.

General characteristics

Proxima Centauri is a red dwarf, because it belongs to the main sequence on the Hertzsprung–Russell diagram and is of spectral class M5.5. Its total luminosity over all wavelengths is only 0.16% that of the Sun, although when observed in the wavelengths of visible light the eye is most sensitive to, it is only 0.0056% as luminous as the Sun. More than 85% of its radiated power is at infrared wavelengths.

Because its distance is known, the actual diameter of Proxima Centauri can be calculated to be about 1/7 that of the Sun, or 1.5 times that of Jupiter. The mass has been calculated directly, although with less precision, from observations of microlensing events to be .

The measured surface gravity of Proxima Centauri, given as the base-10 logarithm of the acceleration in units of cgs, is 5.20. This is 162 times the surface gravity on Earth.

A 1998 study of photometric variations indicates that Proxima Centauri completes a full rotation once every 83.5 days. A subsequent time series analysis of chromospheric indicators in 2002 suggests a longer rotation period of  days. This was subsequently ruled out in favor of a rotation period of  days.

Structure and fusion 
Because of its low mass, the interior of the star is completely convective, causing energy to be transferred to the exterior by the physical movement of plasma rather than through radiative processes. This convection means that the helium ash left over from the thermonuclear fusion of hydrogen does not accumulate at the core but is instead circulated throughout the star. Unlike the Sun, which will only burn through about 10% of its total hydrogen supply before leaving the main sequence, Proxima Centauri will consume nearly all of its fuel before the fusion of hydrogen comes to an end.

Convection is associated with the generation and persistence of a magnetic field. The magnetic energy from this field is released at the surface through stellar flares that briefly (as short as per ten seconds) increase the overall luminosity of the star. These flares can grow as large as the star and reach temperatures measured as high as 27 million K—hot enough to radiate X-rays. Proxima Centauri's quiescent X-ray luminosity, approximately (4–16) erg/s ((4–16) W), is roughly equal to that of the much larger Sun. The peak X-ray luminosity of the largest flares can reach  erg/s ( W).

Proxima Centauri's chromosphere is active, and its spectrum displays a strong emission line of singly ionized magnesium at a wavelength of 280 nm. About 88% of the surface of Proxima Centauri may be active, a percentage that is much higher than that of the Sun even at the peak of the solar cycle. Even during quiescent periods with few or no flares, this activity increases the corona temperature of Proxima Centauri to 3.5 million K, compared to the 2 million K of the Sun's corona, and its total X-ray emission is comparable to the sun's. Proxima Centauri's overall activity level is considered low compared to other red dwarfs, which is consistent with the star's estimated age of 4.85 years, since the activity level of a red dwarf is expected to steadily wane over billions of years as its stellar rotation rate decreases. The activity level appears to vary with a period of roughly 442 days, which is shorter than the solar cycle of 11 years.

Proxima Centauri has a relatively weak stellar wind, no more than 20% of the mass loss rate of the solar wind. Because the star is much smaller than the Sun, the mass loss per unit surface area from Proxima Centauri may be eight times that from the solar surface.

Life phases 
A red dwarf with the mass of Proxima Centauri will remain on the main sequence for about four trillion years. As the proportion of helium increases because of hydrogen fusion, the star will become smaller and hotter, gradually transforming into a so-called  "blue dwarf". Near the end of this period it will become significantly more luminous, reaching 2.5% of the Sun's luminosity and warming up any orbiting bodies for a period of several billion years. When the hydrogen fuel is exhausted, Proxima Centauri will then evolve into a helium white dwarf (without passing through the red giant phase) and steadily lose any remaining heat energy.

The Alpha Centauri system may form naturally through a low-mass star being dynamically captured by a more massive binary of  within their embedded star cluster before the cluster disperses. However, more accurate measurements of the radial velocity are needed to confirm this hypothesis. If Proxima Centauri was bound to the Alpha Centauri system during its formation, the stars are likely to share the same elemental composition. The gravitational influence of Proxima might have stirred up the Alpha Centauri protoplanetary disks. This would have increased the delivery of volatiles such as water to the dry inner regions, so possibly enriching any terrestrial planets in the system with this material.

Alternatively, Proxima Centauri may have been captured at a later date during an encounter, resulting in a highly eccentric orbit that was then stabilized by the galactic tide and additional stellar encounters. Such a scenario may mean that Proxima Centauri's planetary companions have had a much lower chance for orbital disruption by Alpha Centauri. As the members of the Alpha Centauri pair continue to evolve and lose mass, Proxima Centauri is predicted to become unbound from the system in around 3.5 billion years from the present. Thereafter, the star will steadily diverge from the pair.

Motion and location 

From Earth's vantage point, Proxima Centauri is separated from Alpha Centauri by 2.18 degrees, or four times the angular diameter of the full Moon. Proxima Centauri has a relatively large proper motion—moving 3.85 arcseconds per year across the sky. It has a radial velocity toward the Sun of 22.2 km/s. From Proxima Centauri, the Sun would appear as a bright 0.4-magnitude star in the constellation Cassiopeia, similar to that of Achernar or Procyon from Earth.

Among the known stars, Proxima Centauri has been the closest star to the Sun for about 32,000 years and will be so for about another 25,000 years, after which Alpha Centauri A and Alpha Centauri B will alternate approximately every 79.91 years as the closest star to the Sun. In 2001, J. García-Sánchez et al. predicted that Proxima Centauri will make its closest approach to the Sun in approximately 26,700 years, coming within .

Alpha Centauri 

Proxima Centauri has been suspected to be a companion of the Alpha Centauri binary star system since its discovery in 1915. For this reason, it is sometimes referred to as Alpha Centauri C. Data from the Hipparcos satellite, combined with ground-based observations, were consistent with the hypothesis that the three stars are a gravitationally bound system. Kervella et al. (2017) used high-precision radial velocity measurements to determine with a high degree of confidence that Proxima and Alpha Centauri are gravitationally bound.

Six single stars, two binary star systems, and a triple star share a common motion through space with Proxima Centauri and the Alpha Centauri system. (The co-moving stars include HD 4391, γ2 Normae, and Gliese 676.) The space velocities of these stars are all within 10 km/s of Alpha Centauri's peculiar motion. Thus, they may form a moving group of stars, which would indicate a common point of origin, such as in a star cluster.

Planetary system

As of 2022, three planets (two confirmed and one candidate) have been detected in orbit around Proxima Centauri, with one being among the lightest ever detected by radial velocity ("d"), one close to Earth's size within the habitable zone ("b"), and a possible gas dwarf that orbits much farther out than the inner two ("c").

Searches for exoplanets around Proxima Centauri date back to the late 1970s. In the 1990s, multiple measurements of Proxima Centauri's radial velocity constrained the maximum mass that a detectable companion could possess. The activity level of the star adds noise to the radial velocity measurements, complicating detection of a companion using this method. In 1998, an examination of Proxima Centauri using the Faint Object Spectrograph on board the Hubble Space Telescope appeared to show evidence of a companion orbiting at a distance of about 0.5 AU. A subsequent search using the Wide Field Planetary Camera 2 failed to locate any companions. Astrometric measurements at the Cerro Tololo Inter-American Observatory appear to rule out a Jupiter-sized planet with an orbital period of 2−12 years.

In 2017, a team of astronomers using the Atacama Large Millimeter/submillimeter Array reported detecting a belt of cold dust orbiting Proxima Centauri at a range of 1−4 AU from the star. This dust has a temperature of around 40 K and has a total estimated mass of 1% of the planet Earth. They tentatively detected two additional features: a cold belt with a temperature of 10 K orbiting around 30 AU and a compact emission source about 1.2 arcseconds from the star. There was a hint at an additional warm dust belt at a distance of 0.4 AU from the star. However, upon further analysis, these emissions were determined to be most likely the result of a large flare emitted by the star in March 2017. The presence of dust is not needed to model the observations.

Planet b

Its estimated mass is at least 1.17 times that of the Earth. Moreover, the equilibrium temperature of Proxima Centauri b is estimated to be within the range where water could exist as liquid on its surface; thus, placing it within the habitable zone of Proxima Centauri.

The first indications of the exoplanet Proxima Centauri b were found in 2013 by Mikko Tuomi of the University of Hertfordshire from archival observation data. To confirm the possible discovery, a team of astronomers launched the Pale Red Dot project in January 2016. On August 24, 2016, the team of 31 scientists from all around the world, led by Guillem Anglada-Escudé of Queen Mary University of London, confirmed the existence of Proxima Centauri b through a peer-reviewed article published in Nature. The measurements were performed using two spectrographs: HARPS on the ESO 3.6 m Telescope at La Silla Observatory and UVES on the 8 m Very Large Telescope at Paranal Observatory. Several attempts to detect a transit of this planet across the face of Proxima Centauri have been made. A transit-like signal appearing on September 8, 2016, was tentatively identified, using the Bright Star Survey Telescope at the Zhongshan Station in Antarctica.

In 2016, in a paper that helped to confirm Proxima Centauri b's existence, a second signal in the range of 60 to 500 days was detected. However, stellar activity and inadequate sampling causes its nature to remain unclear.

Planet c

Proxima Centauri c is a candidate super-Earth or gas dwarf about 7 Earth masses orbiting at roughly  every . If Proxima Centauri b were the star's Earth, Proxima Centauri c would be equivalent to Neptune. Due to its large distance from Proxima Centauri, it is unlikely to be habitable, with a low equilibrium temperature of around 39 K. The planet was first reported by Italian astrophysicist Mario Damasso and his colleagues in April 2019. Damasso's team had noticed minor movements of Proxima Centauri in the radial velocity data from the ESO's HARPS instrument, indicating a possible additional planet orbiting Proxima Centauri. In 2020, the planet's existence was confirmed by Hubble astrometry data from c. 1995. A possible direct imaging counterpart was detected in the infrared with the SPHERE, but the authors admit that they "did not obtain a clear detection." If their candidate source is in fact Proxima Centauri c, it is too bright for a planet of its mass and age, implying that the planet may have a ring system with a radius of around 5 . In 2022, a study was published which disputed the radial velocity confirmation of the planet.

Planet d

In 2019, a team of astronomers revisited the data from ESPRESSO about Proxima Centauri b to refine its mass. While doing so, the team found another radial velocity spike with a periodicity of 5.15 days. They estimated that if it were a planetary companion, it would be no less than 0.29 Earth masses. Further analysis confirmed the signal's existence leading up the discovery's announcement in February 2022.

Habitability

Prior to the discovery of Proxima Centauri b, the TV documentary Alien Worlds hypothesized that a life-sustaining planet could exist in orbit around Proxima Centauri or other red dwarfs. A planet orbiting within this zone may experience tidal locking to the star. If the orbital eccentricity of this hypothetical planet is low, Proxima Centauri would move little in the planet's sky, and most of the surface would experience either day or night perpetually. The presence of an atmosphere could serve to redistribute the energy from the star-lit side to the far side of the planet.

Proxima Centauri's flare outbursts could erode the atmosphere of any planet in its habitable zone, but the documentary's scientists thought that this obstacle could be overcome. Gibor Basri of the University of California, Berkeley argued: "No one [has] found any showstoppers to habitability." For example, one concern was that the torrents of charged particles from the star's flares could strip the atmosphere off any nearby planet. If the planet had a strong magnetic field, the field would deflect the particles from the atmosphere; even the slow rotation of a tidally locked planet that spins once for every time it orbits its star would be enough to generate a magnetic field, as long as part of the planet's interior remained molten.

Other scientists, especially proponents of the rare-Earth hypothesis, disagree that red dwarfs can sustain life. Any exoplanet in this star's habitable zone would likely be tidally locked, resulting in a relatively weak planetary magnetic moment, leading to strong atmospheric erosion by coronal mass ejections from Proxima Centauri. In December 2020, a candidate SETI radio signal BLC-1 was announced as potentially coming from the star. The signal was later determined to be human-made radio interference.

Observational history 
In 1915, the Scottish astronomer Robert Innes, director of the Union Observatory in Johannesburg, South Africa, discovered a star that had the same proper motion as Alpha Centauri. He suggested that it be named Proxima Centauri (actually Proxima Centaurus). It was the lowest-luminosity star known at the time.

In 1951, American astronomer Harlow Shapley announced that Proxima Centauri is a flare star. Examination of past photographic records showed that the star displayed a measurable increase in magnitude on about 8% of the images, making it the most active flare star then known.
The proximity of the star allows for detailed observation of its flare activity. In 1980, the Einstein Observatory produced a detailed X-ray energy curve of a stellar flare on Proxima Centauri. Further observations of flare activity were made with the EXOSAT and ROSAT satellites, and the X-ray emissions of smaller, solar-like flares were observed by the Japanese ASCA satellite in 1995. Proxima Centauri has since been the subject of study by most X-ray observatories, including XMM-Newton and Chandra.

Because of Proxima Centauri's southern declination, it can only be viewed south of latitude 27° N. Red dwarfs such as Proxima Centauri are too faint to be seen with the naked eye. Even from Alpha Centauri A or B, Proxima would only be seen as a fifth magnitude star. It has apparent visual magnitude 11, so a telescope with an aperture of at least  is needed to observe it, even under ideal viewing conditions—under clear, dark skies with Proxima Centauri well above the horizon. In 2016, the International Astronomical Union organized a Working Group on Star Names (WGSN) to catalogue and standardize proper names for stars. The WGSN approved the name Proxima Centauri for this star on August 21, 2016, and it is now so included in the List of IAU approved Star Names.

In 2016, a superflare was observed from Proxima Centauri, the strongest flare ever seen. The optical brightness increased by a factor of 68× to approximately magnitude 6.8. It is estimated that similar flares occur around five times every year but are of such short duration, just a few minutes, that they have never been observed before. On 2020 April 22 and 23, the New Horizons spacecraft took images of two of the nearest stars, Proxima Centauri and Wolf 359. When compared with Earth-based images, a very large parallax effect was easily visible. However, this was only used for illustrative purposes and did not improve on previous distance measurements.

Future exploration 

Because of the star's proximity to Earth, Proxima Centauri has been proposed as a flyby destination for interstellar travel. If non-nuclear, conventional propulsion technologies are used, the flight of a spacecraft to Proxima Centauri and its planets would probably require thousands of years. For example, Voyager 1, which is now travelling  relative to the Sun, would reach Proxima Centauri in 73,775 years, were the spacecraft travelling in the direction of that star. A slow-moving probe would have only several tens of thousands of years to catch Proxima Centauri near its closest approach, before the star would recede out of reach.

Nuclear pulse propulsion might enable such interstellar travel with a trip timescale of a century, inspiring several studies such as Project Orion, Project Daedalus, and Project Longshot. Project Breakthrough Starshot aims to reach the Alpha Centauri system within the first half of the 21st century, with microprobes travelling at 20% of the speed of light propelled by around 100 gigawatts of Earth-based lasers. The probes would perform a fly-by of Proxima Centauri to take photos and collect data of its planets' atmospheric compositions. It would take 4.25 years for the information collected to be sent back to Earth.

Explanatory notes

References

Further reading

External links

 
 
 
 
 
 
 
 
 

 
M-type main-sequence stars
Flare stars
Emission-line stars
Planetary systems with two confirmed planets
C

191510??
Centaurus (constellation)
0551
070890
Centauri, V645
Stars with proper names
TIC objects